Willsch is a surname. Notable people with the surname include:

 Klaus-Peter Willsch (born 1961), German politician
 Marius Willsch (born 1991), German footballer